Liushi is a town of Li County, Hebei, China. , it has 26 villages under its administration.

References

Township-level divisions of Hebei
Li County, Hebei